Mark Woods is a sports writer and broadcaster, based in Edinburgh, United Kingdom.

His work regularly features in several print and broadcast media outlets in the UK and overseas, in particular on basketball, athletics, cricket and triathlon.

He has been a presenter for BBC Radio 5 Live, BBC Radio Scotland, Premier Sports and TalkSport, and commentator on Sky Sports, Eurosport and BBL TV.

Writing

He was presently editor of MVP Magazine, and contributes to BT Sport, ESPN.com, The Daily Record and The Herald. He is the author of several children's books on sport.

Awards

In 2012, he was the first non-American to be shortlisted in the Professional Basketball Writers Association annual awards.

Personal life

Hailing originally from Belfast, he attended the University of Dundee.

References

External links 
 Official Website

British sports broadcasters
Alumni of the University of Dundee
Living people
Year of birth missing (living people)
People educated at Our Lady and St. Patrick's College, Knock
Sports journalists from Northern Ireland